Ikembe, is a type of musical instrument of the lamellaphone group, common amongst the people of Rwanda, Burundi and the Congo. The instrument consists of several iron lamellae, fixed to a rectangular wooden soundbox.

In Swahili the word imba means song. Kuimba means to sing, as in the phrase "nitakwenda kuimba" (I go to sing). Swahili, as in many languages, uses a type of binomial nomenclature to create new words to describe unfamiliar or new objects, occurrences or people, based on existing words or concepts. By combining part of the word for mother = ma with the word for song = imba using r as a connector we come up with the word marimba = mother of song. We can then extrapolate from the research of A.M. Jones, quoted by Osborne that ka = small combined with the word imba = song should mean little mother of song.

Osborne cites examples of various names for these mbira from all over the continent, which have the Swahili word for song as their root. Admittedly, Swahili, like English, is not a virgin language, but rather a combination of a variety of languages making it useful for trading purposes. However, at the root it's still based on the Bantu languages of the peoples of Central and East Africa, which again is why it is so useful as a language of trade. A cursory examination of the root of these words gives us these common variations: imba, imbe and embe.

The following variations are used: likimbe, likembe (Amba of Uganda and the Tabura of the Congo Basin), lulimba (Yao of Malawi, Tanzania and Mozambique), lukembe (Alur and Acholi of Uganda), irimba and kajimba (Makonde of Tanzania and Mozambique), itshilimba (Bemba of Zambia), karimba (Zimbabwe), kalimba and ikembe Bahutu of Rwanda and Burundi. There are many other names for this instrument, but the predominance of names with this root is undeniable. The spelling is not as important as the sound that is made in vocalizing the names.

References

Anderson, Lois. The Miko Modal System of Kiganda Xylophone Music. 2 vols. Phd Diss. UCLA, 1968.
Galpin, Francis. A textbook of European musical instruments, their origin, history and character. (reprint) Westport, Conn: Greenwood Press, 1976.
Wiggins, Trevor and Joseph Kobom. Xylophone music from Ghana. Crown Point, IN: White Cliffs Media, 1992.
Warner Dietz, Betty and Olatunji, Michael Babatunde. (1965). Musical Instruments of Africa: Their Nature, Use, and Place in The Life of a Deeply Musical People. New York: John Day Company.
Ottenberg, Simon. Seeing with Music: The Lives of 3 Blind African Musicians. Seattle, WA: University of Washington Press, 1996

Journal articles
Tracey, Hugh, 'A Case for the Name Mbira' in the African Music Society Journal, no. 3 (1964)

External links
World Musical Instrument Database. New York City: ARChive of Contemporary Music
World Music and Percussion, Frame Drums, Riq, Tambourines, by N. Scott Robinson
Origin of Southern African marimbas, by Andrew Tracey
The ku-marker in Swahili, by Anna-Lena Lindfors
Ethnologue.com – languages
Soundclick artist: Fatai Rolling Dollar
The Royal Museum for Central Africa's ethnomusicological archive of instruments and recordings from Central Africa.

Comb lamellophones